The Hainan leaf warbler (Phylloscopus hainanus) is a species of Old World warbler in the family Phylloscopidae.

Its natural habitats are subtropical or tropical moist lowland forest and subtropical or tropical moist montane forest. It is threatened by habitat loss and fragmentation.

The Hainan leaf warbler is endemic to China, distributed in the south of Hainan Island.

References

External links
Image

Hainan leaf warbler
Birds of Hainan
Endemic birds of China
Hainan leaf warbler
Hainan leaf warbler
Hainan leaf warbler
Hainan leaf warbler
Taxonomy articles created by Polbot